Stunt Dawgs is a 1992–1993 animated comedic adventure series about a team of stunt performers and their bulldog named Human who also solve crimes and battle villains.  The villain in question is invariably an insane Hollywood director called Richard P. Fungus and his band of stunt performers called the Stunt Scabs. Based on the 1978 film Hooper, the series was produced by DIC Animation City, Franklin/Waterman Productions and Rainforest Entertainment and co-created by Jeff Franklin, best known for co-producing Full House.

A short-lived comic adaptation from Harvey Comics was written by Michael Gallagher and drawn by Nelson Dewey, who worked from scripts and model sheets from the series.

Characters

Stunt Dawgs 
The Stunt Dawgs are the titular protagonists of the show. They are a team of crime-fighting stunt performers. Their team vehicle is the Fat Cat and their base of operations is the Wreck.

 Needham - the leader of the Stunt Dawgs, and the main character and level-headed hero of the series, with an exaggeratedly large chest and chin. He speaks with a Texan accent and has his own theme, which is played in the end credits in some episodes and heard in an instrumental form throughout the series. Needham's main battle cry is "T.T.K.B.", which means "Time To Kick Butt". Another of his battle cries is "I loooove being a Stunt Dawg", which he uses when he's enjoying himself, either doing a stunt or foiling one of Fungus's plans. His vehicle is a six-wheeled monster truck whose name is Oscar (as seen on the tailgate). It can get through traffic jams by rising high and thinning its tires, and can also fly long distances by rising on its chassis and firing rocket engines from the back, as seen in the episode "Calling Dr. Fungus". Needham was named after former stuntman/director Hal Needham (who also directed Hooper). In the comic, he is sometimes depicted with black hair and a yellow sleeveless shirt instead of brown hair and a white T-shirt with red trim.
 Splat - the rich, laid-back financier of the Stunt Dawgs who speaks with a posh accent, denoting his cultured upbringing from a wealthy family. His parents disapprove of his choice of profession. His real name, which is first used in the episode "Jailhouse Dawgs", is Gordon Gillis Wellington III; in "Rich Dawg, Poor Dawg", Slyme calls him Gordon Gillis Wheeler Wellington III. His vehicle is the Crash & Burn, a military-style helicopter.
 Sizzle - the only female member of the Stunt Dawgs, with fiery red hair and a temper to match. She wears purple spandex, speaks with a Southern accent very similar to Rogue of the X-Men (who was also voiced by Lenore Zann in the animated series), and carries a pocket-sized flamethrower. She occasionally flirts with Needham and is revealed to have some sort of history with Fungus's brother. Her vehicle is a racecar-like pink car with giant rear tires.
 Skidd - an "almost crazy" motorcycle driver who is often found pondering near-nonsensical themes. He is known for his terrible breath and loud burps. His vehicle is the Sidewinder, a yellow motorcycle with folding wings and purple tires. In the comic, he is sometimes depicted with black hair and a red jacket instead of red hair and a black jacket, and a more suave appearance overall.
 Crash - a bald African-American stunt driver who (as his name suggests) is known for getting into accidents. He is also often found running away from Velda, who has a crush on him. His vehicle is the Bullet, a red and white rocket car with giant rear tires like Sizzle's.
 Human - the Stunt Dawgs' rather intelligent bulldog. His vehicle is a rocket-powered skateboard that appears occasionally on the show; whenever he launches from The Wreck (the Stunt Dawgs' hideout), he lands dazed in a dumpster.

Stunt Scabs 
The Stunt Scabs are the antagonists of the show. They are a gang of stunt performers whose goal is the destruction of the Stunt Dawgs. Their team vehicle and mobile base of operations is the Roller.

 Richard P. Fungus - the primary villain of the show. Fungus is an egomaniacal director who serves as the Stunt Scabs' boss and is obsessed with pursuing money, fame, and the destruction of the Stunt Dawgs. His battle cry is "Lights, Camera, Mayhem!!!" He is also known for exclaiming, "I despise him!" He hates nothing more in all the world than to be called "Dick". He wears a toupée and is revealed in the episode "Viva Lost Wages" to have a charismatic but insane brother, who is imprisoned in an asylum and looks to escape so he can commit fratricide. Fungus was originally to have been named "Peter Bogus", allegedly a parody of director Peter Bogdanovich. He also appears at the end of most shows in the Franklin/Waterman Entertainment logo. His vehicle is a production truck with a robotic arm that mounts a movie camera (which doubles as a laser cannon).
 Airball (sometimes Hairball) - Fungus's short-statured second-in-command who imitates Napoleon Bonaparte, frequently calling Fungus "Mon capitan". His attempts to get on Fungus's good side are frequently shot down with Fungus screaming at him "Shut up, you suck-up!" (which is often followed by a nonsensical insult such as "You piece of elephant cheese!"), and Fungus usually takes out his frustration on Airball when things go wrong. His vehicle is Airblast, a light blue airplane with an open canopy. In the comic, Fungus introduces him as "a skydiver who's had a few rough landings".
 Badyear - a large, brawny construction worker with a rattlesnake for a belt. He appears to have a lead foot (literally, a right foot made of lead), but in "Badyear's Billions", it is shown to be a boot that covers a normal-looking right foot. He is frugal to the point of being cheap, always trying to extort money from others and cadge rewards for even the most minor services. His vehicle is the Blimp, a blue monster truck with purple tires that sports a cannon called the Blimpzooka and a movable, jaw-like front bumper as well.
 Half-A-Mind - barely a human being and apparently a cyborg of some kind (with a wheel for a leg), Half-A-Mind is prone to falling apart after getting hit. He has the lowest intelligence in the group, but he is briefly infused with intelligence in one episode, calling himself "Mind-And-A-Half", taking over the Stunt Scabs and electing Whiz Vid - who upgraded Half-A-Mind's body with high intellect and new cybernetic body parts - his second-in-command and personal assistant. His vehicle is the Halfback, a light green motorized tricycle.
 Lucky - a bushy-browed guy who is unquestioningly loyal to Fungus. He is only slightly more intelligent than Half-A-Mind and suffers from luck of the worst kind. He always looks at his fortunes optimistically with his catchphrase "Could've been worse", although they often get worse immediately after he says it. Ironically (or maybe not), Friday the 13th is his luckiest day. His vehicle is the Scorpion, a light green motorcycle with (as its name implies) a scorpion motif. In the comic, he is sometimes seen wearing glasses.
 Whiz Vid (sometimes Whiz Kid) - a psychotic young genius whose inventions constantly backfire or do the exact opposite of what they should, often leading him to yell "Glitch!" His catchphrase is an odd laugh that sounds like "Whoo-hoy!" His vehicle is the Cannon, a red and yellow mobile artillery with six wheels. In the comic, he is sometimes seen wearing a red and white exosuit.

Other characters 
 Slyme - Fungus's sleazy lawyer, who is as greedy as him and uses many legal malapropisms. His last name is "Whiplash" and he travels around in a large purple limousine. In the comic, he works for the law firm of Dewey, Cheatam and Howe and constantly secretes green slime.
 Bambi, Bumbi, Bombi - the three identical bimbo girlfriends of Fungus.
 Nina Newscaster - a news reporter who is often present for the feuds of the Stunt Dawgs and the Stunt Scabs.
 Velda - a woman who has a crush on Crash (bordering on an insanely jealous obsession). She was left at the altar by Crash, although according to him, it was just part of a stunt and not a real marriage.

Cast 
 Neil Crone as Whiz Vid and Needham
 Harvey Atkin as Badyear and Half-A-Mind
 Ron Rubin as Slyme and Airball
 Barbara Budd as Nina Newscaster
 Greg Morton as Crash, Velda, and Splat
 John Stocker as Richard P. Fungus
 Greg Swanson as Skidd and Lucky
 Lenore Zann as Sizzle and Bambi

Episodes

Home media 
The show was available on VHS.

References

External links 
 
 SPTI's Anime & Animation Brochure: Stunt Dawgs

1992 American television series debuts
1993 American television series endings
1990s American animated television series
Television series by DIC Entertainment
Harvey Comics titles
American children's animated comedy television series
Television shows adapted into comics
Comics based on television series
Comics about dogs
Adventure comics
Humor comics
Crime comics